EE Ticket is the first studio album by guitarist Marc Bonilla, released in June 1991 through Reprise Records.

Track listing

Personnel
Marc Bonilla – guitar, guitar synthesizer, synthesizer
Kevin Gilbert – vocals, keyboard, Mellotron, organ, production
Ronnie Montrose – guitar, slide guitar (track 10)
Keith Emerson – piano
Don Frank – drums, percussion
Troy Luccketta – drums
Dave Moreno – bass

References

Marc Bonilla albums
1991 debut albums
Reprise Records albums